Johan Jacob Greter (25 October 1900 in Amsterdam – 29 January 1975 in Ede) was a Dutch equestrian who competed in the 1936 Summer Olympics. In 1936 he and his horse Ernica won the silver medal as part of the Dutch show jumping team, after finishing sixth in the individual jumping competition.

Greter fought at the Grebbeberg on 12 May 1940. In 1942 he was taken prisoner. He escaped by jumping off the train and reached England, where he joined the RAF. He was awarded the Dutch Bronze Cross in 1944 and 1947.

References

External links
profile

1900 births
1975 deaths
Dutch show jumping riders
Olympic equestrians of the Netherlands
Dutch male equestrians
Equestrians at the 1936 Summer Olympics
Olympic silver medalists for the Netherlands
Sportspeople from Amsterdam
Olympic medalists in equestrian
Medalists at the 1936 Summer Olympics
Royal Air Force personnel of World War II
20th-century Dutch people